Cecil Hornby (25 April 1907 – 1964) was an English professional footballer who played as a wing half for Sunderland.

References

1907 births
1964 deaths
Sportspeople from West Bromwich
English footballers
Association football wing halves
Oakengates Athletic F.C. players
Leeds United F.C. players
Sunderland A.F.C. players
Brierley Hill Alliance F.C. players
Cradley Heath F.C. players
English Football League players